KLDE (104.9 FM) is a radio station licensed to serve Eldorado, Texas.  The station is owned by Tenn-Vol, Corp.

The station was assigned the KLDE call letters by the Federal Communications Commission on July 16, 2007.

References

External links

LDE
Oldies radio stations in the United States